The Arkansas Environmental Academy is the official environmental training institution for the U.S. state of Arkansas. The main campus is located on the grounds of Southern Arkansas University Tech in Camden, Arkansas.

Mission 
The mission of the Arkansas Environmental Academy is to provide environmental education for the licensing and certification of wastewater, water, and solid waste management operators of municipal or industrial facilities in Arkansas.  The degree program results in an associates of applied science degree in Environmental.

Locations 
The Academy's campus is located at Southern Arkansas University Tech in Camden.

External links
Arkansas Environmental Academy

Public education in Arkansas
Southern Arkansas University
Environment of Arkansas
Environmental studies institutions in the United States